Mosharraf Hossain Mongu is a Bangladesh Nationalist Party politician and the former Member of Parliament of Barisal-3.

Career
Mongu was elected to parliament from Barisal-3 as a Bangladesh Nationalist Party candidate in 1991, 1996, and 2001. He was sued in 2006 for misappropriation of funds.

References

Bangladesh Nationalist Party politicians
Living people
5th Jatiya Sangsad members
6th Jatiya Sangsad members
7th Jatiya Sangsad members
8th Jatiya Sangsad members
People from Barisal District
Year of birth missing (living people)